Dizaj-e Leyli Khani (also Romanized as Dīzaj-e Leylī Khānī; also known as Dīzaj-e Leylīkhān and Dīzaj-e Leylī Khvānī) is a village in Meydan Chay Rural District, in the Central District of Tabriz County, East Azerbaijan Province, Iran. At the 2006 census, its population was 2,965, in 781 families.

References 

Populated places in Tabriz County